Podlesnaya is a rural locality (a village) in Zhityovskoye Rural Settlement, Syamzhensky District, Vologda Oblast, Russia. The population was 5 as of 2002.

Geography 
Podlesnaya is located 25 km southwest of Syamzha (the district's administrative centre) by road. Babino is the nearest rural locality.

References 

Rural localities in Syamzhensky District